Aaron Brown (born October 10, 1985) is a former American football running back. He was drafted by the Detroit Lions in the sixth round of the 2009 NFL draft. He played at the collegiate level for Texas Christian University (TCU). He recorded a 10.45 100-meter dash time on the track, one of the fastest prep times in the nation in 2004.

College career
Once at TCU, Brown made an immediate impact.  In his first game as a true freshman in 2005, he ran for 163 yards in a nationally televised game against Utah.  For the year, he rushed for 758 yards and six touchdowns, as well as three receiving touchdowns.  His efforts helped the Horned Frogs win the Mountain West Conference championship in their first year as members of the conference, and Brown himself was named MWC Freshman of the Year.

As a sophomore in 2006, Brown led TCU with 801 rush yards and nine touchdowns, and was the team's second-leading receiver with 34 receptions for 455 yards and one touchdown.  His 84-yard touchdown reception against Baylor put the Frogs ahead for good in what was their third consecutive victory over teams from the Big 12 Conference.  He was named Second-team All-MWC.

Before his junior year in 2007, Brown was named Preseason MWC Offensive Player of the Year.

Professional career

Detroit Lions
He was drafted 192nd overall in the 6th round by the Detroit Lions in the 2009 NFL Draft. During his first NFL pre-season game, Brown scored two touchdowns, in the victory against the Atlanta Falcons.

On September 4, 2011, he was waived by the Lions. He was re-signed on November 28 and released again on December 27.

Cincinnati Bengals
Brown signed with the Cincinnati Bengals on February 17, 2012. He was waived on August 24, 2012.

External links
 TCU Horned Frogs bio
 Just Sports Stats

1985 births
Living people
People from Katy, Texas
Players of American football from Texas
American football running backs
TCU Horned Frogs football players
Detroit Lions players
Cincinnati Bengals players
Sacramento Mountain Lions players
Sportspeople from Harris County, Texas